The canton of Marcillat-en-Combraille is a former administrative division in central France. It was disbanded following the French canton reorganisation which came into effect in March 2015. It consisted of 13 communes, which joined the new canton of Montluçon-3 in 2015. It had 6,025 inhabitants (2012).

The canton comprised the following communes:

Arpheuilles-Saint-Priest
La Celle
Durdat-Larequille
Marcillat-en-Combraille
Mazirat
La Petite-Marche
Ronnet
Saint-Fargeol
Saint-Genest
Saint-Marcel-en-Marcillat
Sainte-Thérence
Terjat
Villebret

Demographics

See also
Cantons of the Allier department

References

Former cantons of Allier
2015 disestablishments in France
States and territories disestablished in 2015